In Greek mythology, Xenopatra (Ancient Greek: Ξενοπάτρα), also called Chthonopatra (Χθονοπάτρα) was a Phthian princess who later on became the queen of Locris.

Biography 
Xenopatra was the daughter of King Hellen of Thessaly, the eponym of the Hellenes. Her mother was the oread Orseis (Othreis), and sister to Aeolus, Dorus, Xuthus and probably Neonus. 

Chthonopatra married her uncle King Amphictyon of Locris and by him mothered Physcus, his successor. Other possible children of the couple were King Itonus of Iton and an unnamed daughter who bore Cercyon by Poseidon, and Triptolemus by Rarus.

Notes

References 
 Cufalo, Domenico, Scholia Graeca in Platonem, I: Scholia ad Dialogos Tetralogiarumi - VII Continens, Roma, Edizioni di storia e letteratura, 2007. .
 Fowler, R. L. (1998), "Genealogical thinking, Hesiod's Catalogue, and the Creation of the Hellenes", in Proceedings of the Cambridge Philological Society, Vol. 44, pp. 1–19. .
 Fowler, R. L. (2000), Early Greek Mythography: Volume 1: Text and Introduction, Oxford University Press, 2000. . Google Books.
 Fowler, R. L. (2013), Early Greek Mythography: Volume 2: Commentary, Oxford University Press, 2013. .
 Pausanias, Description of Greece with an English Translation by W.H.S. Jones, Litt.D., and H.A. Ormerod, M.A., in 4 Volumes. Cambridge, MA, Harvard University Press; London, William Heinemann Ltd. 1918. . Online version at the Perseus Digital Library
 Pausanias, Graeciae Descriptio. 3 vols. Leipzig, Teubner. 1903.  Greek text available at the Perseus Digital Library.
 Stephanus of Byzantium, Stephani Byzantii Ethnicorum quae supersunt, edited by August Meineike (1790-1870), published 1849. A few entries from this important ancient handbook of place names have been translated by Brady Kiesling. Online version at the Topos Text Project.

Deucalionids
Princesses in Greek mythology
Queens in Greek mythology
Thessalian characters in Greek mythology
Locrian mythology
Thessalian mythology